Concrete hinges are hinges produced out of concrete, with no or almost no steel in the hingeneck, which allows a rotation without a relevant bending moment. This high rotations are resulting from controlled tensile cracks as well as creep. Concrete hinges are mostly used in bridge
engineering as monolithic, simple, economic alternative to steel hinges, which would need regular maintenance. Concrete hinges are also used in tunnel engineering. A concrete hinge consist of the hinge neck, which has a reduced cross section and of the hinge heads, which have a strong reinforcement.

History and guidelines 
Freyssinet invented the concrete hinges.
Leonhardt introduced guidelines in the 1960s which are still used till the 2010s.
Janßen introduced the application of concrete hinges in tunnel engineering.
Gladwell developed another guideline for narrowing cross sections, which predicts a stiffer behaviour than the Leonhardt/Janßen-model
Marx and Schacht translated Leonhardts guidelines for the first time in the nowadays used semipropablistic safteyconcept.
Schlappal, Kalliauer and coworkers introduced for the first time both limit caces (service-limit-states (SLS) and ultimate-limite-states (ULS)).
Kaufmann, Markić und Bimschas did further studies on concrete hinges.

Stresses, rotational capacity, bearing capacity 

Due to triaxial compression, strength in the neck region is much higher than for uniaxial compression, because lateral expansion is restricted.
Eurocode 2 suggests for typical dimensions a compressive strength equal to about twice of the unixalial compressive strength. 
Also the concrete hinge neck has no, or almost no reinforcement, but the concrete hinge heads need a dense reinforcement cache, because of the tensile splitting.

Literature 
 Fritz Leonhardt: Vorlesungen über Massivbau - Teil 2 Sonderfälle der Bemessung im Stahlbetonbau.  [Concrete hinges: test report, recommendations for structural design. Critical stress states of concrete under multiaxial static short-term loading Springer-Verlag, Berlin 1986, S. 123–132. (in German)
 VPI: Der Prüfingenieur. Ausgabe April 2010, S. 15–26, (bvpi.de PDF; 2,3 MB). (in German)

References 

Bridge design
hinge